The Temples Order 1971 is an Order in Council in the United Kingdom, setting out the powers of the Inner Temple and Middle Temple to act as local authorities.

References

Inns of Chancery
History of the City of London
Orders in Council
1971 in British law